Rick van den Oever (born 18 April 1992, Sint-Oedenrode) is a Dutch archer who participated at the 2010 Summer Youth Olympics in Singapore. He won the silver medal in the boys' event, losing to Ibrahim Sabry of Egypt in the final.

References 

1992 births
Living people
Dutch male archers
Archers at the 2010 Summer Youth Olympics
People from Sint-Oedenrode
World Archery Championships medalists
Sportspeople from North Brabant